The Gorman Creek Formation is a geologic formation of Early Cretaceous (Valanginian) age in the Western Canada Sedimentary Basin that consists primarily of nonmarine sediments. It is present in the northern foothills of the Canadian Rockies and the adjacent plains in northeastern British Columbia. Plant fossils and dinosaur tracks have been described from its strata.

Lithology 
The Gorman Creek Formation consists of repetitive successions of argillaceous sandstone, siltstone, coaly mudstone, and coal beds. Beds of conglomeratic sandstone are present in some areas, particularly in the upper part of the formation .

Depositional environment 
The Gorman Creek Formation was deposited in primarily nonmarine environments adjacent to the Western Interior Seaway. Depositional settings include deltaic, coastal plain, floodplain, and swamp environments.

Fossil content 
A variety of plant fossils, palynomorph and microfossils have been described from the Gorman Creek Formation, and dinosaur track-ways are present on bedding surfaces near the Narraway River:
"More than 200 fossil footprints are preserved in at least 8 trackways... The majority of the footprints were made by small theropods, but the most dramatic track-way was made by a large biped whose feet were more than a half meter in length."

Thickness and distribution 
The Gorman Creek Formation is present in the foothills of the Canadian Rockies and the adjacent plains from the Sukunka River in northeastern British Columbia to the Berland River in west-central Alberta.

Relationship to other units 
The Gorman Creek Formation forms the upper part of the Minnes Group. It conformably overlies the Monteith Formation and is unconformably overlain by the Cadomin Formation. To the north it grades into the Beattie Peaks, Monach and Bickford Formations which comprise the upper part of the Minnes Group in that area.

See also 
 List of stratigraphic units with theropod tracks

References 

Geologic formations of Canada
Valanginian Stage
Lower Cretaceous Series of North America
Stratigraphy of British Columbia
Cretaceous British Columbia
Sandstone formations of Canada
Ichnofossiliferous formations
Paleontology in British Columbia